José María Bermúdez Espinoza (born 15 August 1975) is a retired Nicaraguan footballer.

Club career
Nicknamed Chema, he played for local top sides Diriangén and Walter Ferretti and had a spell at Honduran side Real Maya whom he joined in 1999.
Bermúdez once scored 9 goals in one league match, in February 1997 for Diriangén against Los Pinares, a record that still stands today.

International career
Bermúdez made his debut for Nicaragua in an October 1995 UNCAF Nations Cup qualification match against Panama and has earned a total of 15 caps, scoring 2 goal. He has represented his country in 6 FIFA World Cup qualification matches and played at the 1995,1997 and 2001 UNCAF Nations Cups.

His final international game was a May 2001 UNCAF Nations Cup match against Panama.

International goals
Scores and results list Honduras' goal tally first.

Retirement
After retiring, Bermúdez became secretary-general at the Nicaraguan Football Association.

References

External links

1975 births
Living people
Association football forwards
Nicaraguan men's footballers
Nicaragua international footballers
Diriangén FC players
C.D. Walter Ferretti players
Place of birth missing (living people)
Nicaraguan expatriate footballers
Expatriate footballers in Honduras
2001 UNCAF Nations Cup players